The 1994 Minnesota Golden Gophers football team represented the University of Minnesota in the 1994 NCAA Division I-A football season. In their third year under head coach Jim Wacker, the Golden Gophers compiled a 3–8 record and were outscored by their opponents by a combined total of 348 to 256.

Defensive tackle Ed Hawthorne and linebacker Broderick Hall were named All-Big Ten first team.  Kicker Mike Chalberg was named All-Big Ten second team.  Defensive back Justin Conzemius was named first team Academic All-American.   Kicker Mike Chalberg, defensive back Justin Conzemius, offensive lineman Chris Fowlkes, offensive lineman Luke Glime, linebacker Luke Hiestand, offensive lineman Todd Jesewitz, linebacker Ben Langford, wide receiver Tony Levine, defensive back Dan LiSanti, linebacker Craig Sauer, quarterback Cory Sauter and  linebacker Chris Smith were named Academic All-Big Ten.

Chris Darkins was awarded the Bronko Nagurski Award and Bruce Smith Award.  Craig Sauer was awarded the Carl Eller Award.  Free safety Rishon Early was awarded the Bobby Bell Award.  Justin Conzemius was awarded the Butch Nash Award.  Ed Hawthorne was awarded the Paul Giel Award.

The total attendance for the season was 253,851, which averaged to 42,308 per game.  The season attendance high was against Iowa, with 53,340 in attendance.

Schedule

Roster

Game summaries

Penn State

at Kansas State

at Wisconsin

Iowa

Sources: Box score and Game recap

References

Minnesota
Minnesota Golden Gophers football seasons
Minnesota Golden Gophers football